The Agonist is a Canadian melodic death metal band from Montreal, Quebec, formed in 2004. The current line up consists of lead guitarist Danny Marino, bassist Chris Kells, drummer Simon Mckay, rhythm guitarist Pascal "Paco" Jobin and lead vocalist Vicky Psarakis, who joined in March 2014 following the departure of vocalist and founding member Alissa White-Gluz. Both White-Gluz and Psarakis use growled and clean vocals. Originally known as the Tempest, the band adopted their current moniker upon their signing to Century Media in 2007. To date, the Agonist has released six studio albums; the latest, Orphans, was released in September 2019. Touring extensively since their first album, they have shared the stage with bands such as Arsonists Get All the Girls, Epica, the Faceless, Chelsea Grin, Kamelot, and Visions of Atlantis.

History

Once Only Imagined (2004−2008) 

The band released their first album Once Only Imagined on August 14, 2007. Originally intended as a demo, the release prompted the Agonist to add metal drummer Simon McKay to the band. Released August 28, 2007, the video for "Business Suits and Combat Boots" was filmed by acclaimed director David Brodsky (Strapping Young Lad, Gwar, God Forbid).  The video was voted the number 6 video of the year 2007 on MTV2's Headbanger's Ball.

After releasing the album, the Agonist toured with God Forbid, Arsis, Sonata Arctica, Overkill, Visions of Atlantis, and Enslaved. One of the band's tours was disrupted when their equipment trailer was damaged in a blizzard in the Rocky Mountains. White-Gluz was named one of "the hottest chicks in metal" in the July 2007 issue of Revolver.

Lullabies for the Dormant Mind (2008−2010) 

The band released their second album, Lullabies for the Dormant Mind, in March 2009. The mini-video for "...And Their Eulogies Sang Me To Sleep" off the album Lullabies for the Dormant Mind, also filmed by David Brodsky, was released April 18, 2009. On April 22, they released the video for "Birds Elope With The Sun," which consists of live concert footage from the band's tour.  Their third video, for the single, Thank You Pain premiered on the Peta2 Blog on September 3, 2009. The band achieved major popularity with the release of Lullabies for the Dormant Mind, mostly for their single / video "Thank You Pain". The album debuted at No. 105 on the Billboard Heatseeksers album charts.
Vocalist Alissa White-Gluz appeared in March on Blackguard's album Profugus Mortis on the song "The Sword". She was again named the "hottest chick in metal" in the May 2009 issue of Revolver.

While touring Lullabies for the Dormant Mind, the Agonist made their first trips to Mexico, Venezuela, Japan, China, Colombia, and toured Europe.  They toured with Epica and Scar Symmetry in December 2010.

Prisoners (2011–2013) 

In late 2011, the Agonist took part in Kamelot's Pandemonium Over North America 2010 Tour with Alestorm and Blackguard. Marino was unable to tour with the band and was replaced by ex-Catalyst guitarist Justin Deguire. While on tour, the band sold the EP The Escape, two tracks scheduled to appear on the band's third full-length album. It was mixed by Tue Madsen (the Haunted, Dark Tranquillity, Suicide Silence).

White-Gluz told metalconcerts.net that the band's music has become more mature, not necessarily heavier or more melodic. She elaborated by saying there are more "classic" influences like Pantera and Radiohead. She told Lithium Magazine that the record could be good for someone with an open mind musical taste, or bad for someone who only likes Thank You, Pain. The album's final recording processes took place following the conclusion of the Kamelot tour. It was produced by the band's long-time producer Christian Donaldson.

The Agonist released the album Prisoners on June 4, 2012 via Century Media records. "Ideomotor" was the first single. The video of "Panophobia" was released October 24, 2012, and featured live and behind-the-scenes footage of the band playing Montreal's Heavy Montréal Festival. In support of Prisoners, the Agonist toured with Danzig and Corrosion of Conformity in North America, and Aldious in Japan.

White-Gluz's departure, Eye of Providence and Five (2014–2019) 

In March 2014, White-Gluz announced that she had been chosen as the replacement for Angela Gossow as frontwoman of the Swedish melodic death metal band Arch Enemy. She also revealed that the group knew it was "over" and that she and they had parted ways. Vicky Psarakis was then revealed as the new lead singer of the group. In April 2017, White-Gluz revealed detailed the circumstances of her departure and how she considered it the "biggest betrayal" she'd ever felt in her life. The Agonist later released their own public statement disputing her account, citing unprofessional behavior and a lack of respect for fans and band mates as the reason for her departure, and that the band is "breathing a lot easier" in her absence. Their fourth album, Eye of Providence, was released on February 23. The EP Disconnect Me was released in April. The album Five was released on September 30, 2016.

Orphans and Days Before the World Wept (2019–present) 
On June 7, 2019, the band released a new single "In Vertigo". Their album Orphans was then released on September 20, 2019 through Rodeostar Records. Orphans was nominated as Metal/Hard Music Album of the Year at the Juno Awards of 2020.

From January 7–11, 2020, the band took part in the 70000 Tons of Metal cruise, which was 37 metal bands playing, at sea, on the "Royal Caribbean Independence of the Seas". The day before departure, Kells announced that he would be unable to go on the cruise, and that he has been banned from entering the United States for five years. Kells issued an explanation, and announced that Pavlo Haikalis would be filling in for him. The Agonist was also booked to tour the western US in support of Fleshgod Apocalypse, but those dates were cancelled due to Covid restrictions. The band did travel to Portugal, however, for Laurus Nobilis Music Famalicão 2020.

On September 9, 2021, the band released their new song "Remnants in Time". On October 15, they released the EP Days Before the World Wept.

Musical style
The Agonist are known primarily for Vicky Psarakis' ability to use both clean vocals and metal growls, and Danny Marino's use of two or more intersecting melodies and unorthodox chords which often feature wide intervals and octave displacements. Themes revolve around moral concerns such as animal rights, societal dilemmas, and the state of the world.

Band members

Current members
 Danny Marino – lead guitar (2004–present), rhythm guitar (2004–2007)
 Chris Kells – bass, backing vocals (2004–present)
 Simon McKay – drums (2007–present)
 Pascal "Paco" Jobin – rhythm guitar (2010–present)
 Vicky Psarakis – lead vocals (2014–present)

Former members
 Derek Nadon – drums (2004–2007)
 Andrew Tapley – rhythm guitar (2007–2008)
 Chris Adolph – rhythm guitar (2008-2010)
 Alissa White-Gluz – lead vocals (2004–2014)

Live members
 Justin Deguire – rhythm guitar (2011)
 Pavlo Haikalis - bass, backing vocals (2020, 2022)

Timeline

Discography

Studio albums

EPs

Singles

Music videos

Awards and nominations

Juno Award

!
|-
!scope="row"| 2020
| Orphans
| Metal/Hard Music Album of the Year
| 
| style="text-align:center;"|
|-
!scope="row"| 2022
| Days Before the World Wept
| Metal/Hard Music Album of the Year
| 
| style="text-align:center;"|
|}

References

External links

 Century Media Profile Page  (defunct)
 Official Facebook Page

2004 establishments in Quebec
Canadian death metal musical groups
Canadian metalcore musical groups
Musical groups established in 2004
Musical groups from Montreal
Musical quintets
Napalm Records artists
Female-fronted musical groups